Fulton Umbrellas is the United Kingdom's largest manufacturer of umbrellas.

History 

The company was founded in 1956 in London, England by Arnold Fulton, an engineer and inventor, who was born in Poland and survived the Warsaw Ghetto, whose sister and brother-in-law ran an umbrella factory in Stockholm.

As of 2006, they were the UK's leading manufacturer with a 35% market share, producing four million a year, and £30 million in annual retail sales.

Fulton had a Royal Warrant from Queen Elizabeth the Queen Mother, and in 2008 were granted one by the Queen. The company is now run by the founder's son, Nigel Fulton.

See also 
 Boutique Bétaille
 Thomas Brigg & Sons
 James Smith & Sons
 Swaine Adeney Brigg

References

External links 
 Official homepage

1956 establishments in England
British Royal Warrant holders
Companies based in the London Borough of Brent
Clothing brands of the United Kingdom
Clothing retailers of England
Clothing companies based in London
British companies established in 1956
Umbrella manufacturers